The effective interest rate (EIR), effective annual interest rate, annual equivalent rate (AER) or simply effective rate is the percentage of interest on a loan or financial product if compound interest accumulates over a year during which no payments are made. It is the compound interest payable annually in arrears, based on the nominal interest rate. It is used to compare the interest rates between loans with different compounding periods, such as weekly, monthly, half-yearly or yearly. 

Depending on the jurisdictional definition, the effective interest rate may be higher than the annual percentage rate (APR), since the APR method does not take compounding into account. By contrast, the EIR annualizes the periodic rate with compounding. EIR is the standard in the European Union and many other countries, while APR is often used in the United States.

The EIR is more relevant for borrowers who are short of income, because it computes the effects of compounding assuming no periodic payment of interest, so that future interest accrues on both the principal and the current interest. However, the APR reflects the annual total interest charge assuming periodic interest is paid as soon as it accrues. For example, if one borrows a principal debt of $1000 at an interest of 2% every month, and makes no monthly payments, the compounded debt at the end of the year is $1000 × (1.02)12 = $1268.24, or $268.24 of interest, making EIR 26.8%. By contrast, if the interest of $1000 × 0.02 = $20 is paid each month, but none of the principal, the annual interest is $20 × 12 = $240, making APR 24%.

The term nominal EIR or nominal APR can refer (subject to regulation) to an annualized rate that does not take into account front-fees and other costs.

Annual percentage yield or effective annual yield is the analogous concept for savings or investments, such as a certificate of deposit. Since a loan by a borrower is an investment for the lender, both terms can apply to the same transaction, depending on the point of view.

Effective annual interest or yield may be calculated or applied differently depending on circumstances, and the definition should be studied carefully. For example, a bank may compute effective yield on a portfolio of loans after subtracting expected losses and adding income from fees, meaning that the interest paid by each borrower may differ substantially from the bank's effective yield.

Calculation
The effective interest rate is calculated as if compounded annually. The effective rate is calculated in the following way, where r is the effective annual rate, i the nominal rate, and n the number of compounding periods per year (for example, 12 for monthly compounding):

For example, a nominal interest rate of 6% compounded monthly is equivalent to an effective interest rate of 6.17%.  6% compounded monthly is credited as 6%/12 = 0.005 every month. After one year, the initial capital is increased by the factor (1 + 0.005)12 ≈ 1.0617.  Note that the yield increases with the frequency of compounding.

When the frequency of compounding is increased up to infinity (as for many processes in nature) the calculation simplifies to:

where  is Euler's mathematical constant.

The effective interest rate is a special case of the internal rate of return.

The annual percentage rate (APR) is calculated in the following way, where i is the interest rate for the period and n is the number of periods.

 APR = i × n

Effective interest rate (accountancy)
In accountancy the term effective interest rate is used to describe the rate used to calculate interest expense or income under the effective interest method. This is not the same as the effective annual rate, and is usually stated as an APR rate.

See also
 Real interest rate
 Real versus nominal value (economics)
 For a zero-coupon bond such as a US treasury bill, an annual effective discount rate may be specified instead of an effective interest rate, because zero coupon bonds trade at a discount from their face values.

Notes

References
Need to be edited

External links
 http://www.miniwebtool.com/effective-interest-rate-calculator/ Online Effective Interest Rate Calculator
 Convert an Effective Interest Rate to a nominal Annual Percentage Rate
 Convert a nominal Annual Percentage Rate to an Effective Interest Rate
 http://www.mftransparency.org/resources/microfinance-traps-handbook/ Microfinance Transparent Pricing Supervision Handbook

Interest rates
Management cybernetics